The pied starling or African pied starling (Lamprotornis bicolor) is a bird endemic to South Africa, Lesotho and Eswatini. It is common in most of its range, but largely absent from the arid northwest and the eastern lowlands of South Africa. It is found in open habitats such as grassland, karoo scrub, thornbush and agricultural land, and often associates with farm animals.

Description

It has a white iris and yellow lower mandible. The sexes are alike, but the juvenile has unglossed plumage, a brown iris and a dull yellow lower mandible. There are no subspecies. This species has a number of calls, but the most familiar is a skeer kerrra kerrra. There is also a soft warbling song.

Behaviour

Breeding
The pied starling usually nests in tunnels in river banks, but will use holes in buildings, straw bales or natural tree holes. There is a record of a nest being constructed in a wrecked ship  from the shore. The nest is lined with a wide variety of plant material and items of human waste such as paper and rope. The female typically lays four eggs, though clutches of two to six are known. The eggs are blue-green, immaculate or with some red spots.

Both parents feed the chicks, assisted by helpers, which are typically subadult or unmated birds. This cooperative breeding is reinforced by mutual allofeeding between adults, behaviour reinforced by the bright gape, a feature normally lost in adults of most bird species.

This starling is commonly double-brooded. It may be parasitised by the great spotted cuckoo and greater honeyguide.

Roosting
Its roosts may be shared by lesser kestrels or wattled starlings. It will feed with European starlings, but they rarely roost together.

Feeding
Like other starlings, the pied starling is an omnivore, taking a wide range of invertebrates, seeds and berries, but its diet is mainly insects, including many ants and termites. It will take figs from gardens and some human food discards. Foraging is frequently near livestock, with birds feeding on insects disturbed by the animals and also perching on cattle or sheep to remove ectoparasites.

The pied starling has sometimes been seen as a pest when it takes soft fruit such as grapes or figs, and was also itself considered good eating. However, it is little persecuted at present.

Status
The population size has not been quantified, but it is believed to be large as the species is described as 'common' in at least parts of its range. It is not believed to approach the thresholds for the population decline criterion of the IUCN Red List (i.e. declining more than 30% in ten years or three generations). For these reasons, the species is evaluated as Least Concern.

References

External links
(African) Pied starling - Species text in The Atlas of Southern African Birds

pied starling
Birds of Southern Africa
pied starling
pied starling